Luzon is a surname. Notable people with this surname include:
Avraham Luzon (born 1955), Israeli football executive
Francisco Luzón (1948-2021), Spanish economist
Guy Luzon (born 1975), Israeli former footballer and manager
Javier Moreno Luzón (born 1967), Spanish historian
Omri Luzon (born 1999), Israeli footballer
Yaniv Luzon (born 1981), Israeli footballer

See also
Manila Luzon (stage name for Karl Philip Michael Westerberg), American drag queen

Spanish-language surnames
Hebrew-language surnames